Griffith High School is a public high school located in Griffith, Indiana.

About
Griffith High School was founded in the mid-1900s after the space at the former high school became overcrowded.

Demographics
The demographic breakdown of the 901 students enrolled for the 2012–2013 school year was:

Male - 47.4%
Female - 52.6%
Native American/Alaskan - 0.2%
Asian/Pacific islander - 1.2%
Black - 20.6%
Hispanic - 23.4%
White - 53.3%
Multiracial - 1.3%

In addition, 45.6% of the students qualified for free or reduced lunch.

Athletics
Griffith is part of the Northwest Crossroads Conference.  They compete under the name "Panthers" and the school colors are black and gold.  The following sports are offered at Griffith:

Baseball (boys)
Basketball
Cross country
Football (boys)
State champions - 1997
Golf
Gymnastics (girls)
Soccer
Softball (girls)
Swimming
Tennis
Track
Volleyball (girls)
Wrestling (boys)

Image gallery

See also
 List of high schools in Indiana

References

External links
 Web Site

Public high schools in Indiana
Schools in Lake County, Indiana